Giovana Queiroz Costa (born 21 June 2003), known as Gio Queiroz or simply Gio, and sometimes Giovana Costa, is a Brazilian professional footballer who plays as a winger for English Women's Super League club  Arsenal and the Brazil women's national team.

Early life
Queiroz was born in 2003 in São Paulo, Brazil. In 2007, her family moved to Weston, Florida and settled until 2014 until they moved to Madrid, Spain. She was part of the Atlético Madrid academy until 2017.

Club career
Queiroz played in the youth teams of Atlético Madrid. She started her senior career in 2018 at Primera División club Madrid CFF. On 9 December 2018, she made her professional debut as a 15-year-old in a 0–7 defeat against Barcelona. Queiroz played 14 matches and scored one goal with Madrid until February 2020.

On 17 July 2020, Barcelona announced the signing of Queiroz for an undisclosed fee on a three-year deal. On 12 August 2021, Levante signed Gio on a one–year loan deal until the end of the 2021–22 season. She made her official debut for Levante in qualification for the 2021–22 UEFA Women's Champions League, entering the match against Celtic as a substitute. She scored her first goals for the club in the final of qualifying Round 1 against Rosenborg. She entered the match as a substitute and scored twice in extra time, including the match-winning goal that helped Levante advance to Round 2 of qualifying.

In 2022, it was announced that Queiroz won the Samba Gold Feminino 2021 after defeating 29 opponents. The medal honors the best Brazilian player working abroad and was given to the women's category for the first time.

In September 2022, it was reported that Queiroz was sold to Arsenal for around €40,000 and that she would go on loan to Everton for the season. She was recalled by Arsenal the following January.

International career

Youth

United States
Queiroz was called twice to represent the United States U17 national team in May and June 2019, playing at the UEFA Development Tournament held in May 2019 in Czech Republic. She started all three matches the team played at the tournament, which concluded with three wins for the United States U17 and the tournament title. In June, Queiroz was called again to a training camp held at the Elite Athlete Training Center in Chula Vista, California.

Spain
In August 2019, Queiroz was called to represent the Spain U17 national team in a friendly tournament held in Sweden in September of the same year. There, she played against the United States, whom she had played for months earlier, scoring a hat-trick and leading Spain to a 4–3 win.

Brazil
In February 2020, Queiroz was named to Brazil's under-17 squad. She played against Austria and Portugal, scoring a goal in a 2–0 win against the former.

Senior
On 8 October 2020, Queiroz was called by Brazil women's national football team's coach Pia Sundhage to a training camp in Portimão, Portugal on 18–28 October 2020. On 9 November, Queiroz was called to represent Brazil in two friendly matches against Argentina. Later, Argentina quit the matches with Ecuador taking its place. On 1 December, she debuted for Brazil coming in the half time of the 8–0 win over Ecuador. In June 2021, Queiroz was named to Brazil's squad for the 2020 Summer Olympics. She played against Zambia in the group stage match, coming up as substitute. Brazil ended up being eliminated at the penalties by Canada at the quarter-finals.

In June 2022, Queiroz was named to Brazil's squad for the 2022 Copa América Femenina. Brazil ended up winning the tournament for the 8th time, with Queiroz starting the initial match against Argentina and coming up as a substitute against Uruguay at the group stage. In July 2022, Queiroz was named to Brazil's squad for the 2022 FIFA U-20 Women's World Cup at Costa Rica, but she withdrew from the tournament.

International goals

Personal life
Her brother, André Luiz Queiroz Costa, is also a footballer. He played for Real Madrid youth teams and represented the United States men's national under-17 soccer team at the 2018 Nike International Friendlies.

Honours

Club
Barcelona
 Primera División: 2020–21
UEFA Women's Champions League: 2020–21

Brazil

Copa América Femenina: 2022

Individual

 Samba Gold: 2021

References

External links
 
 Profile at Barcelona
 Profile at La Liga

2003 births
Living people
Footballers from São Paulo
People from Weston, Florida
Soccer players from Florida
Brazilian women's footballers
Brazil women's international footballers
Olympic footballers of Brazil
American women's soccer players
Spanish women's footballers
Spain women's youth international footballers
Brazilian emigrants to the United States
Brazilian emigrants to Spain
American emigrants to Spain
Spanish people of Brazilian descent
American sportspeople of Brazilian descent
Naturalized citizens of the United States
Naturalised citizens of Spain
Women's association football forwards
Footballers at the 2020 Summer Olympics
Atlético Madrid Femenino players
Madrid CFF players
FC Barcelona Femení players
FC Barcelona Femení B players
Levante UD Femenino players
Segunda Federación (women) players
Primera División (women) players
21st-century American women
Arsenal W.F.C. players
Everton F.C. (women) players
Brazilian expatriate sportspeople in England
American expatriate sportspeople in England
Spanish expatriate sportspeople in England